The West Central Railway (abbreviated WCR), one of the 19 zones of the Indian Railways, came into existence on 1 April 2003. It is headquartered at Jabalpur. It was created by taking away two divisions namely Bhopal division and Jabalpur division from central railways and one division namely Kota division from western railway. The WCR zone provides rail route coverage to the west central region of India. Most of its route is in the states of Madhya Pradesh and Rajasthan with a very little portion in the state of Uttar Pradesh.

History
On 1 April 2003, the West Central Railway was reconstituted from parts of Central Railway and Western Railway by allocating Jabalpur and Bhopal divisions of the  Central Railway zone (CR) and the reorganized  of the Western Railway zone (WR) to WCR.

Jurisdiction

The zone serves eastern & central Madhya Pradesh, southern Uttar Pradesh, and northeastern Rajasthan state. It contains the Tuglakabad (TKD) locomotive shed, which belongs to Kota Division of WCR but is situated in the Northern Railways territory. WCR meets Northern Railway at Mathura, Western Railway at Nagda, North Western Railway at Chittorgarh, Central Railway at Khandwa and Itarsi, North Central Railway at Bina and Manikpur, South East Central Railway at Katni and East Central Railway at Singaroli stations.

Divisions

There are 3 divisions in West Central Railway zone;

 Jabalpur railway division
 Bhopal railway division
 Kota railway division

Loco sheds
There are five loco sheds in WCR.
 Electric Loco Shed, Tughlakabad
 Electric Loco Shed, Itarsi
 Electric Loco Shed, New Katni  
 Diesel Loco Shed, Katni
 Diesel Loco Shed, Itarsi

Tourist places
The following places of tourist interest are located on the rail route of WCR:

Bandhavgarh National Park, 
Bhojpur, 
Ranthambore National Park, 
Bharatpur, 
Jabalpur, 
Sanchi, 
Bhimbaithka, Kanha National Park, 
Shivpuri National Park, Bhopal, 
Kota, 
Vidisha, 
Bundi, 
Pachmarhi, 
Pench Tiger Reserve, 
Panna National Park and 
Maihar

See also

 All India Station Masters' Association (AISMA)
 Rail transport in Madhya Pradesh

References

External links
 West Central Railway website

West Central Railway zone
W
2003 establishments in India